Heumarkt is a Stadtbahn interchange station in the historic Altstadt (old town) of Cologne, Western Germany. The station is an important hub between (low-floor) East-West and (high-floor) North-South connections.

History 

The station is named after one of Cologne's busiest old-town squares, on which it is also located and − to a less favorable extent − whose build environment it has shaped for the last 40 years.

Public transport at Heumarkt began in 1879, with several horsecar lines encircling the square. Connections were provided to Dome and Central Station to the North, Neumarkt and Ring to the West, and Rodenkirchen in the South. By 1902 lines throughout the city were upgraded to electric tram lines, with tram stops on Heumarkt's eastern and western sides. With completion of the Deutz Suspension Bridge in 1915, service was complemented with suburban rail connections into Cologne's left-Rhenish districts. Due to the square's proximity to the Rhine, a single station within the bridge's head was planned, but never realized.

By 1950, the square was served by one tram station, with lines crossing the square midway. Service was restricted to East-West connections, while North-South connections were redirected along the Cologne Ring.

During the early 1970s, the former tram system was converted to the currently used Stadtbahn system. This resulted in an extended feeder for the bridge and − in order to obtain exclusive right-of-way for the trains − fences, a level-crossing and traffic-signals for pedestrians. Consequently, the square was split in two: a larger northern part and a smaller, more neglected southern part.

In conjunction with the Stadtbahn's extension project called North-South-Rail (Nord-Süd-Stadtbahn), Heumarkt was meant to regain its hub functions. The project's intention is to more directly link the Hauptbahnhof with Cologne's southern districts, with Heumarkt station in-between. With the project currently halfway through, Heumarkt's underground North-South link was opened on 15 December 2013. It is currently (2022) the southern terminal station for line 5, but with completion of the project will also include line 16, then running all the way to Bonn. The total costs for the station were 90 million euros. It lies 27 meters below ground-level, making it the city's deepest station. One of the reasons for this is provisions for in the future to potentially also accommodate the East-West line within the underground station. At this stage however, putting the East-West line below ground is not under further consideration.

Notable places nearby 
 Church of St. Maria im Kapitol
 Church of St. Maria Lyskirchen
 Gürzenich
 Overstolzenhaus  
 Rheinauhafen within walking distance

See also 
 List of Cologne KVB stations
 Transport in Cologne

References

External links 
 
 
 station info page 

Cologne KVB stations
Innenstadt, Cologne
Railway stations in Germany opened in 2013